Ascalenia antiqua is a moth in the family Cosmopterigidae. It is found in Israel and Egypt.

Adults have been recorded between September and January.

The larvae feed on Tamarix aphylla. They live in galls made by Eriophyes species in the twigs of their host plant. Pupation also takes place in this gall.

References

Moths described in 1925
Ascalenia
Moths of Africa
Moths of Asia